The 2017 Bangkok Challenger was a professional tennis tournament played on hard courts. It was the ninth edition of the tournament and was part of the 2017 ATP Challenger Tour. It took place in Bangkok, Thailand between 2 and 8 January 2017.

Singles main-draw entrants

Seeds

 1 Rankings are as of December 26, 2016.

Other entrants
The following players received wildcards into the singles main draw:
  Congsup Congcar
  Chayanon Kaewsuto
  Patcharapol Kawin
  Warit Sornbutnark

The following player received entry into the singles main draw with a protected ranking:
  Cedrik-Marcel Stebe

The following players received entry from the qualifying draw:
  Lloyd Glasspool
  Soon-woo Kwon
  Nils Langer
  Jürgen Zopp

Champions

Singles

 Janko Tipsarević def.  Blaž Kavčič 6–3, 7–6(7–1).

Doubles

 Grégoire Barrère /  Jonathan Eysseric def.  Yūichi Sugita /  Wu Di 6–3, 6–2.

References

 
 ATP Challenger Tour
Tennis, ATP Challenger Tour, Bangkok Challenger
Tennis, ATP Challenger Tour, Bangkok Challenger

Tennis, ATP Challenger Tour, Bangkok Challenger